Francesco Ottavio Magnocavalli, also spelled Magnocavallo (1707–1789) was an Italian architect and writer.

Born in Casale Monferrato to Ippolito, count of Varengo (today part of the commune of Gabiano) and the countess Veronica Pico Pastrona, he studied at a Jesuit college in Parma. On his return to Casale he established himself as an essayist, dramatist and poet, before adopting the career for which he is best known, as an architect. He worked on a number of palazzi in Casale and designed churches throughout Monferrato.

In 1738 he married Maria Felice, daughter of the count of Salmour.

Notes

1707 births
1789 deaths
People from Casale Monferrato
18th-century Italian architects
Architects from Piedmont